Alexander Gennadevich Mogilny (born February 18, 1969) is a Russian former professional ice hockey player and the current president of Amur Khabarovsk of the Kontinental Hockey League (KHL). He was the first National Hockey League (NHL) draftee to defect from the Soviet Union in order to play in North America.

During his NHL career, Mogilny played for the Buffalo Sabres, Vancouver Canucks, Toronto Maple Leafs and New Jersey Devils. He tied for the NHL lead in goals in the 1992–93 season with 76, and became a member of the Triple Gold Club by winning the Stanley Cup in 2000 with New Jersey.

Biography

Early life
Growing up in the Soviet Union, Mogilny was recruited at a young age to join CSKA Moscow, commonly referred to as the "Red Army Team". As the CSKA organization was a functioning division of the Soviet Army, it was able to draft the best young hockey players in the Soviet Union onto the team.

In 1986, Mogilny was made a full-time player of CSKA Moscow. He finished his first year with 15 goals and 16 points in 28 games. At only 17 years old, Mogilny and Sergei Fedorov were the youngest members on the team. Still, team officials anticipated that the duo, along with the looming arrival of Pavel Bure, would succeed the top line of Vladimir Krutov, Igor Larionov and Sergei Makarov. Mogilny's first major appearance for the Soviet Union on the international stage was at the 1987 World Junior Ice Hockey Championships. He finished the tournament with 3 goals and 2 assists in 6 games. However, his team was ejected from the tournament during its last game as a result of the brawl between the Soviet Union players and Team Canada known as the "Punch-up in Piestany". The International Ice Hockey Federation (IIHF) suspended all the players involved in that game from competing in international events for 18 months. The penalty was eventually reduced to six months, which allowed Mogilny to compete in the 1988 World Junior Ice Hockey Championships. He finished the tournament with 9 goals and 18 points in 7 games en route to a silver medal finish and winning the Top Forward award. He also played with the senior team at the 1988 Winter Olympics, where he won a gold medal as the team's youngest player. The next year, at the 1989 World Junior Championships, he served as team captain and was a part of the commanding Bure-Fedorov-Mogilny line which led their team to a gold medal. Mogilny finished that tournament with 7 goals and 12 points in 7 games. He went on to win his first World Championships when the Soviet Union won the 1989 World Ice Hockey Championships. Despite his success with the Soviet National team, and his growing importance on CSKA Moscow, Mogilny yearned for a life in the NHL and decided to join the Buffalo Sabres, the NHL team that had drafted him 89th overall in the 1988 NHL Entry Draft. He boarded a plane in Stockholm at the conclusion of the 1989 World Championships and defected to North America.

Buffalo Sabres

Prior to the start of his rookie season, Mogilny was given the number 89 by team management in recognition of both the year he arrived and his place in the draft. He subsequently wore #89 for his entire playing career.

He made his NHL debut on October 5, 1989 against the Quebec Nordiques during the 1989–90 season and scored his first NHL goal just 20 seconds into his first shift. (Coincidentally, the Sabres were celebrating their 20th season in the NHL.) After the perfect start to his new life, the rest of Mogilny's first season was middling. He was considered by some to be one of the best players outside the NHL prior to his defection, but it took time for him to adjust to a new country and culture. He finished his first NHL season with 43 points in 65 games and improved to 30 goals and 64 points during his sophomore season. He continued his ascension with 39 goals and 84 points in only 67 games the next year and broke out as an NHL superstar in his fourth season. On December 21, 1991, in a game against the Toronto Maple Leafs, Mogilny scored five seconds into the game to tie the NHL record for fastest goal scored to start a game.

In the 1991–92 season, the Buffalo Sabres acquired future captain Pat Lafontaine from the New York Islanders. Lafontaine developed an instant chemistry playing with Mogilny and two players elevated their games to new heights by maximizing their speed and skill. The 1992–93 season was a banner year for Mogilny, as he scored an astonishing 76 goals and 127 points in 77 games. His 76 goals tied Finnish rookie Teemu Selänne for the NHL goal-scoring lead that year, which was the fifth-highest season goal total in NHL history and the first time that two players developed outside North America led the NHL in goals. Mogilny's 76 goals and 127 points set the highest season totals ever for a Russian NHL player, a record which held until Nikita Kucherov scored 128 points in the 2018-19 NHL season, and the highest goal totals in Buffalo Sabres franchise history. He scored his 50th goal in his 46th game that year, but it did not count as an official 50 goals in 50 games record as it occurred during the team's 53rd game. Mogilny finished the season with seven hat-tricks including three in four games, two four-goal games and a stretch where he scored 23 goals in 13 games. In the 1993 playoffs, he played a critical role for the Sabres in the first round, with 6 goals in 4 games, which helped his team sweep the Boston Bruins in the first round. In the second round, the Sabres were matched with the Montreal Canadiens, who had just finished a 100-point regular season. After scoring a goal and an assist in the series opener, Mogilny broke his leg during a collision in game 3 and was unable to return for the rest of the series. Without their superstar sniper, the Sabres would go on to lose the next game and the series in 4 games. It was the second time in back-to-back years that Mogilny had broken his leg, the first time during the 1992 playoffs. The multiple broken leg injuries in such a short time would limit the potential of his talent before Mogilny reached his prime. The second leg injury would also delay his start to the next season. He served as the Sabres' captain for a period that year, the first Russian captain in NHL history, and finished the year with 79 points in 66 games.

Vancouver Canucks
Due to financial restraints brought about by the contractual demands of Lafontaine and Dominik Hašek, the Sabres were forced to trade Mogilny, along with a fifth round draft pick (Todd Norman), to the Vancouver Canucks in exchange for Michael Peca, Mike Wilson and a first-round draft pick (Jay McKee) on July 8, 1995.

Vancouver Canucks President Pat Quinn acquired Mogilny with the sole intention of winning the franchise's first Stanley Cup. The team had just been swept in round 2 of the 1995 playoffs by the Chicago Blackhawks, and Quinn gave up three important pieces to acquire one of the league's best talents. The motive was to pair Mogilny with Pavel Bure and form a dominant scoring line, as the two had played together at CSKA Moscow and had a well-established chemistry off the ice. Bure, however, would miss almost their entire first season together with a torn ACL, so Mogilny played primarily with Cliff Ronning and Martin Gélinas. He had an outstanding first year, leading the team with 55 goals, 107 points, and finishing 3rd in the league in goals. Mogilny followed that with 9 points in 6 games in his first playoff series for Vancouver but it was to no avail as the Canucks were ousted in the first round by the Stanley Cup champions that year, the Colorado Avalanche, who were led by Joe Sakic, Peter Forsberg and Patrick Roy. Mogilny would lead the Canucks in scoring again his second year with 73 points, but it would mark the end of his success in Vancouver. In the subsequent years, assorted injuries and inconsistency dropped his production to 128 points in 157 games over the next three seasons and the Canucks missed the playoffs each year. He was also unable to find the expected on-ice success with Bure as both players preferred to play on their off-wing. After trading Bure to the Florida Panthers in January 1999, the Canucks traded Mogilny to the New Jersey Devils at the trade deadline in 2000 in exchange for Brendan Morrison and Denis Pederson.

New Jersey Devils
Mogilny did not produce at the level that was expected, but nonetheless, the Devils won the Stanley Cup that year after beating the Dallas Stars in the finals. With the win, Mogilny captured his first Stanley Cup and became a member of the prestigious Triple Gold Club.

The next year, he stayed mainly injury-free for the first time in three years had a strong bounce-back season, leading the Devils with 43 goals and finishing with 83 points. The Devils went back to the Stanley Cup Finals for a second consecutive season, but could not repeat and lost to the Colorado Avalanche in 7 games.

Toronto Maple Leafs
During the free agency period of 2001, multiple teams expressed interest in Mogilny as the Devils could not meet his market price. On July 3, 2001, he signed a four-year, $22 million contract with the Toronto Maple Leafs, citing the team's fanbase and that there was no better place to be for his decision, although admitted that he was disappointed to be leaving New Jersery and that the Devils were unwilling to meet his contract demands. He became the elite winger the Leafs lacked for many years since Wendel Clark's first stint with the team. This was also a reunion for Mogilny and Quinn, as the latter was the General Manager of the Leafs who signed Mogilny that summer and was the one who traded for Mogilny to Vancouver. Mogilny had a strong start with his new team, scoring two goals in his Maple Leafs debut. He also scored his 400th career NHL goal a few games later, in a 6-1 win over the Mighty Ducks of Anaheim. He battled through various injuries throughout the season but was able to finish his first year third in team scoring playing primarily on a line with Gary Roberts and Robert Reichel. Mogilny followed that season by playing a substantial role during the Leafs playoff run that spring. With Sundin injured for most of the 2002 playoffs, Mogilny led the Leafs in playoff goal-scoring and scored two goals in both Game 7 wins against the New York Islanders and Ottawa Senators. Toronto however, was eliminated from the playoffs by the stingy Carolina Hurricanes in the Eastern Conference Finals.

The next season, head coach Pat Quinn decided to start the season by pairing his two best forwards, Mogilny and Sundin, on the team's first line. Darcy Tucker was the initial third forward on the line but was soon replaced by Nik Antropov after Tucker could not find consistency with the dynamic duo. The new Leafs trio became a dangerous line for the remainder of the season. Mogilny and Sundin had good chemistry playing together, particularly on the powerplay, and both players finished with 70+ point seasons. Mogilny led the team with 79 points, 3 shorthanded goals (tied with Sundin), 9 game-winning goals and added two hat-tricks that year. It was also the only year that Sundin did not lead the Leafs in regular season scoring during his Maple Leafs career. They were matched with the Philadelphia Flyers in the first round, where Mogilny scored his first career playoff hat-trick in Game 1 win, led the team in playoff goals again, but the Leafs were eliminated in six games. He was awarded the Lady Byng Memorial Trophy for sportsmanship and gentlemanly conduct at season's end, the first Leaf to win it since Dave Keon in 1963. It was also the first individual award won by a Maple Leafs player since 1993, when Doug Gilmour was awarded the Frank J. Selke Trophy.

The next year, Mogilny spent most of the season injured as he underwent major hip surgery. He returned late in the season where he recorded his 1,000th career NHL point in dramatic fashion against the Buffalo Sabres: down 5–2 in the third period, the Leafs completed their comeback when Gary Roberts tipped a Mogilny shot for Mogilny's 1,000th career point and the game-tying goal late in the third period. Mogilny then set up Tomáš Kaberle for the thrilling overtime winner immediately after serving a questionable penalty. Despite high expectations for the team that year for a Stanley Cup with many future Hockey Hall of Famers on the roster, they would not have much success in the playoffs. With outstanding performances by goaltender Ed Belfour, Toronto edged the Ottawa Senators in the first round but was eliminated by a physical Philadelphia Flyers team in the second round. Mogilny's fourth season with the club was cancelled due to the lockout and he became a free agent in 2005, as the Leafs were unable to afford Mogilny under the new salary cap. On October 14, 2016, the Maple Leafs unveiled their Top 100 greatest players list where Mogilny was ranked as the #83 greatest Maple Leaf of all-time.

Return to New Jersey
Recovering over the lockout cancelled 2004–05 season, on August 16, 2005, Mogilny returned to New Jersey Devils after agreeing to a two-year, US$7 million contract. Although he scored 25 points in 34 games, Mogilny's chronic hip problem left him as a shadow of his previous self and he was unable to perform at his previous levels. He agreed to play for the Albany River Rats, the Devils' then-American Hockey League (AHL) affiliate, midway through the 2005–06 season for salary cap reasons. His 473 career NHL goals at the time were the most ever for a player entering the AHL. Mogilny finished the year after playing 19 games for the River Rats, but could not gain medical clearance to return to the NHL for the 2006–07 season. He was placed on long-term injury reserve during training camp and retired from professional hockey at the end of the season.

Legacy
Mogilny was the first Russian to be an NHL captain, first Russian named to the NHL All-Star team and holds the highest single-season goal total and second highest single-season point total for a Russian player. He is (as of the end of the 2018–19 season) the third-highest Russian scorer in the history of the NHL. Mogilny was the second Russian player to reach 1,000 points in the NHL, hitting the milestone just a few days after Sergei Fedorov. His 1992–93 tie with Teemu Selänne of Finland made them the first non-North Americans ever to lead the NHL in goals scored.

Post-playing career
Mogilny, who retired following the 2005–06 season, returned to Russia and began consulting for his hometown team, Amur Khabarovsk, in the Kontinental Hockey League (KHL). Admiral Vladivostok of the KHL hired him as its president in 2013. After two seasons with that club, he returned to Khabarovsk to become its president and still holds that title.

In 2016, he was inducted into the Greater Buffalo Sports Hall of Fame. He did not attend the ceremony, and there is speculation that he has been snubbed from the Hockey Hall of Fame because of fears he would not attend the festivities, despite having comparable statistics to recent inductees such as Daniel Alfredsson and Paul Kariya.

International play
At the 1988 Winter Olympics, Mogilny made his senior debut with the Soviet national team as an 18-year-old in Canada. He played with the full-roster Soviet Union team that won the gold medal.

In the 1996 World Cup of Hockey, Russia had played five preliminary games in order to set the groupings for the main tournament stage. Russia was the only team that went undefeated (winning against Finland (Moscow), Germany (Landshut), Sweden (Stockholm), the United States (Detroit) and tied against Canada (Calgary). The United States, Sweden and Finland games saw the pairing line of "Bure-Fedorov-Mogilny", for the first and only time internationally at the senior level, and was considered "perhaps the best forward line on earth" at the time. Mogilny and Fedorov played on the same line and both led the team in scoring, but they lost in the semi-finals against the United States after defeating Finland 5–0 in the quarter-finals.

Player profile

Former Toronto Maple Leafs captain Mats Sundin once called Mogilny the "best player [he's] ever played with". The two were teammates during Mogilny's tenure with the Maple Leafs. Sundin described Mogilny as "gifted, skilled, and a natural hockey player". The late two-time Jack Adams Award winner and former coach of the Canadian Olympic hockey team, Pat Quinn, called him, "The most talented player that he's ever coached." Mogilny was characterized by Quinn as "[h]aving good size and wonderful skating ability, he can play any kind of game".

Sergei Fedorov praised him, saying, "Alex was faster than all of us, [Pavel] Bure and Fedorov, and Alex was a machine. He was built like a machine." "Plus on top of all the crazy skill he had, he’s better than all of us. He’s amazing." Fedorov said all three players were known for their speed, but Mogilny, in his opinion, was the fastest player of them all. "If you went back and forth five times, (Mogilny) will be first," Fedorov said. "I will be third." Igor Larionov, who played with him briefly when Mogilny was a rookie with the Central Army team, was quickly impressed by the young Russian from Khabarovsk. When asked about Mogilny, Larionov said, "He was such a talented guy. Really good with the stick, and smart. He was a natural." Pat Lafontaine described Mogilny as the "[b]est player [he's] seen and played with. I’ve been lucky to play with some great players in my career, but I put Alex as the best player that I had a chance to see and play with talent-wise," LaFontaine said of his teammate. "He was the rare combination of the speed, the skill and finesse, quickness. He was just the full package." Lafontaine and Mogilny were linemates during the 1992–93 season and enjoyed remarkable success, as Mogilny scored 76 goals and Lafontaine had 148 points that year. Lafontaine described that year as follows: "There was a sixth sense. We just had an idea of where each other was going to be on the ice. One thing about Alex, he thinks the game at such a high level. His hockey sense and to be able to have the hands and the feet and the speed, he’s that rare combination of everything." Former long-time New Jersey Devils president Lou Lamoriello once said of Mogilny, "If there was any one player capable of breaking a game open at any given time, he certainly is that. His skating is exceptional. His shot is exceptional."

Often the offensive catalyst for his line and his team, Mogilny has led his team in scoring various times. As his career progressed and injuries began to mount, he evolved into a cerebral play-maker to generate his offence. Mogilny has always been a strong two-way player thanks to a high level of hockey instincts and a tremendous sense of anticipation. His preferred move on a breakaway is a quick snapshot to catch the goaltender off-guard. The backhand five-hole was also one of Mogilny's favourite moves.

Awards and achievements

Fastest Goal by a rookie

 NHL All-Star – 1992, 1993, 1994, 1996, 2001, 2003 (injured)
 NHL second All-Star team – 1993, 1996
 Stanley Cup champion – 2000 
 Goal-scoring leader (tied with Teemu Selänne) – 1993 (76)
 Lady Byng Memorial Trophy – 2003
 Most game-winning goals in a season – 1993 (11)
 Buffalo Sabres Hall of Fame (inducted on January 1, 2011)
 World Junior Championships All-Star team – 1988
 World Junior Championships best forward – 1988
 Member of the Triple Gold Club (June 10, 2000)
 Inducted into the Greater Buffalo Sports Hall of Fame in 2016
 83rd greatest Maple Leaf of all-time

Career statistics

Regular season and playoffs
Bolded numbers indicate season/ playoff leader

International

See also
List of NHL players with 1000 points
List of NHL players with 100 point seasons
List of Eastern Bloc defectors

References

External links

1969 births
Albany River Rats players
American men's ice hockey right wingers
Buffalo Sabres captains
Buffalo Sabres draft picks
Buffalo Sabres players
HC CSKA Moscow players
HC Spartak Moscow players
Ice hockey players at the 1988 Winter Olympics
Lady Byng Memorial Trophy winners
Living people
Medalists at the 1988 Winter Olympics
National Hockey League All-Stars
New Jersey Devils players
Olympic gold medalists for the Soviet Union
Olympic ice hockey players of the Soviet Union
Olympic medalists in ice hockey
Russian ice hockey right wingers
Expatriate ice hockey players in Canada
Soviet defectors to the United States
Soviet expatriate ice hockey players
Soviet ice hockey right wingers
Sportspeople from Khabarovsk
Stanley Cup champions
Toronto Maple Leafs players
Triple Gold Club
Vancouver Canucks players
Soviet expatriate sportspeople in the United States
Russian expatriate sportspeople in the United States
Russian expatriate ice hockey people
Expatriate ice hockey players in the United States